WCYN (1400 kHz) is an AM radio station  broadcasting a classic hits format. Licensed to Cynthiana, Kentucky, United States, the station serves the Lexington area.  The station is owned by WCYN Broadcasting, Inc.

WCYN operates an FM translator, W267CW, on 101.3 MHz.

References

External links

CYN
Radio stations established in 1956
1956 establishments in Kentucky
Cynthiana, Kentucky